The Appleton School is a secondary school and sixth form with academy status located in Croft Road, Benfleet, Essex, England. It currently accommodates 1,600 students from school years 7 to 13, and roughly 100 teachers.

Buildings

The schools buildings are split into different sections, labelled as North Block/N Block, South Block/S Block, C Block, I Block, V Block, Tower Block and the Sixth Form Block.
These typically have one or two subjects per section. For example, with Mathematics and Modern Foreign Languages in S Block, English in I Block, and Science in T Block floors T21-36.
The Sixth Form block is mainly reserved for the students at the Sixth Form, providing them with their own IT room and eating area, however during lessons students from the main school can be taught in the classrooms there.

School performance

The school's most recent inspection by Ofsted was in 2019, with a judgement of Good.

In 2022, the school's Progress 8 benchmark at GCSE was -0.88, compared to -0.21 in Essex as a whole and -0.03 nationally. 38% of children at the school achieved grade 5 or above in English and maths GCSEs, compared to 48% in Essex and 50% nationally. 97% of children at the school went on to further education or employment, compared to 94% in Essex and 94% nationally. 45% of children at the school were entered for the English Baccalaureate, compared to 36% in Essex and 39% nationally.

History

The school was built in 1962, and soon opened in 1965. The first headteacher of the school was Mr Edward Haines from its opening until his retirement in 1974. Since then there have been four other headteachers.

William Lovegrove (1974-1991)
Guy Naylor (1991-2004)
Karen Kerridge (2004-2021)
Sarah Cox (2021–Present)

The school was rated “outstanding“ in 2013 by Ofsted (a government school inspection agency) although this was later downgraded to “good” in 2019.

References

External links
 School Website
 Essex BSF Schools

Academies in Essex
Secondary schools in Essex
Educational institutions established in 1965
1965 establishments in England